The England national cricket team toured New Zealand in January to mid-February 1992 and played a three-match Test series against the New Zealand national cricket team. England won the series 2–0 with one match drawn. The concurrent three-match ODI series was won 3-0 by England. The tour immediately preceded the 1992 World Cup held in Australia and New Zealand where New Zealand did surprisingly well due to a series of innovations under captain Martin Crowe.

Test series summary

1st Test

2nd Test

3rd Test

One Day Internationals (ODIs)

England won the Bank of New Zealand Trophy 3-0.

1st ODI

2nd ODI

3rd ODI

References

1992 in English cricket
1992 in New Zealand cricket
New Zealand cricket seasons from 1970–71 to 1999–2000
1991-92
International cricket competitions from 1991–92 to 1994